Luz is a Portuguese and 
Spanish feminine given name and surname, meaning light. The given name is shortened from Nossa Senhora Da Luz, a Roman Catholic epithet of the Virgin Mary as "Our Lady of Light".

People

Given name 
 Luz Blanchet, Mexican television presenter
 Luz Casal (born 1958), Spanish singer
 Luz Dary Castro (born 1978), Colombian shot putter and discus thrower
 Luz García (born 1977), Dominican Republic model
 Luz Elena González (born 1974), Mexican actress
 Luz Escamilla (born 1977), American politician 
 Luz Jiménez (1897–1965), Mexican model, educator, and storyteller
 Luz Jiménez (actress) (born 1934), Chilean actress
 Luz Magsaysay (1914–2004), First Lady of the Philippines
 Luz Márquez (born 1935), Spanish actress
 Luz Pavon, Mexican model and fashion designer
 Luz Pozo Garza (1922–2020), Spanish poet
 Luz Ramos, Mexican television and film actress
 Luz María Zetina (born 1973), Mexican actress
 Luz Maria Zornoza (born 1994), Peruvian badminton player
Luz Marina Zuluaga (1938-2015), Miss Universe 1958 from Colombia
Luz Mely Reyes (born 1967 or 1968), Venezuelan journalist, writer, and analyst

Nickname 
 Luz Long (1913–1943), German long jumper

Surname 
Adriano Barbosa Miranda da Luz (born 1979), real name of Cape Verdean footballer Néné
Aída Luz (1917-2006), Argentine actress
Aluísio Francisco da Luz (1931–2020), real name of Brazilian footballer Índio
Arturo R. Luz (1926–2021), Filipino visual arts artist
Bernd Luz (born 1966), German visual arts artist
Carlos Coimbra da Luz (1894–1961), Brazilian politician
Consuelo Luz, Chilean-Cuban singer of Sephardic, Mapuche and Basque origins
Diego Luz (born 1990), Uruguayan footballer
Dora Luz, Mexican Singer
Emerson da Luz (born 1982), Cape Verdean footballer
Franc Luz (born 1950), American actor
Hugo Luz (born 1982), Portuguese footballer
Jesus Luz (born 1987), Brazilian model and DJ
Joaquín De Luz (born 1976), Spanish ballet dancer
José Fágner Silva da Luz (born 1988), a.k.a. Fágner, Brazilian football player
José La Luz (born 1950), Spanish activist
Laura Luz (born 1967), Mexican stage and television actress
Luiz Luz (1909–1998), Brazilian footballer
Mark Luz (born 1988), Filipino model and actor
Melânia Luz (1928–2016), Brazilian sprinter
Rafa Luz (born 1992), Brazilian basketball player
Rosa Luz Alegría (born 1949), Mexican physicist
Sandro Gomes da Luz (born 1973), Brazilian football player
Ulrich Luz (1938–2019), Swiss theologian

Fictional characters
Luz Noceda, protagonist of the 2020 American animated series The Owl House
Luz Benedict, older sister of "Bick" Benedict in Edna Ferber's 1952 novel and 1956 film Giant

See also 
Luz (disambiguation)
Luce (name)
Lucy

References 

Spanish feminine given names
Spanish-language surnames
Portuguese-language surnames
Portuguese feminine given names